Hoger is a German male name (from Latin Hogerus) and a surname. Notable people with the name include:

Given name 
 Hoger (abbot) (died 906), abbot of Verden and Helmstedt

Surname 
 Hannelore Hoger (born 1941), German actress and director
 Sam Hoger (born 1980), US mixed martial artist

See also 
Höger (surname)